The Oak of Mamre (hē Drys tēs Mambrḗ) or Oak of Sibta at Khirbet es-Sibte or Ain Sibta in Hebron in the West Bank is a site venerated by some as the "Oak of Abraham". It is distinct from the more ancient site of Mamre. It owes its name to an ancient tree, which seems to be dead but has a young sprig growing next to it, and stands on the grounds of the modern Russian Orthodox Monastery of the Holy Trinity.

The old tree fell in 2019, but there are plans to preserve its trunk and sustain the growth of the young shoot.

Also called The Oak of Abraham, it is an ancient oak tree (Quercus coccifera) which, in one tradition, is said to mark the place where Abraham entertained the three angels or where Abraham pitched his tent.

Different tradition until 1150s
This site is distinct and at a different location from the site considered as Mamre by Herod the Great, Josephus, Constantine the Great, early Church historians and Christian pilgrims all until the mid-12th century, such as Arculf and Abbot Daniel. That site is at a location called in Arabic Ramat al-Khalil (the older name used by archaeologists) and currently Bir al-Haram ar-Rameh, which is a few kilometres north of the site described in this article. After the mid-12th century, the traditional location of the Oak of Mamre migrated to different sites, the most prominent being the current location outside the church.

History

As written in a footnote from an 1895 publication of Arculf's pilgrimage report,
The Oak or Terebinth of Abraham has been shown in two different sites. Arculf and many others (Jerome, Itin[erarium] Hierosol[ymitanum], Sozomen, Eucherius [possibly Eucherius of Lyon], Benjamin of Tudela, the Abbot Daniel,.... etc.) seem to point to the ruin of er Râmeh, near which is Beit el Khulil, or Abraham's House, with a fine spring well. This is still held by the Jews to be the Oak of Mamre. The Christians point to another site, Ballûtet Sebta, where [there] is a fine specimen of Sindian (Quercus Pseudococcifera)."Ballut is the Arabic word for oak.

The site has since been a major attraction for Russian pilgrims before the revolution, and is the only functioning Christian shrine in the Hebron region. After the Russian Revolution, the property came under the control of the ROCOR.

A long-standing tradition is that the Oak of Abraham will die before the appearance of the Antichrist. The main oak trunk has appeared to be dead since 1996. Following construction work in the 1970s, a wooden ring in the form of a chalice was built around the tree, and its roots began to die. In 1997, a small sprig was seen growing near the withered oak. In October 2016, Russian botanists began a project to save the tree. In 1998 a root sprout appeared.

The Hebron Monastery has emerged as a political issue between Russia and Palestinian authorities.

References

External links 
 
A brief compendium of Abraham's Oak or the Oak of Mamre On Madain project Oak of Abraham - Madain Project (en)

Religious places
Individual oak trees
Trees in religion
Individual trees in the Palestinian territories
Religion in Hebron